The IBSF World Championships (known as the FIBT World Championships until 2015), part of the International Bobsleigh and Skeleton Federation, have taken place on an annual basis since 1930. Starting with 2002, no World Championships being held in non-Winter Olympic years. A two-man event was included in 1931 with a combined championship occurring in 1947. Men's skeleton was introduced as a championship of its own in 1982 while women's bobsleigh and skeleton events were introduced in 2000. Both the women's bobsleigh and skeleton events were merged with the men's bobsleigh events at the 2004 championships. A mixed team event, consisting of one run each of men's skeleton, women's skeleton, 2-man bobsleigh, and 2-women bobsleigh, was held from 2007 to 2019. In 2020 it was replaced with skeleton mixed team event, consisting of one run each of men's and women's skeleton. Women's monobob event was included in 2021.

Host cities

Bobsleigh

Four-man
Debuted: 1930.

Medal table

Two-man
Debuted: 1931.

Medal table

Two-woman
Debuted: 2000.

Medal table

Women's Monobob
Debuted: 2021

Medal table

Skeleton

Men
Debuted: 1982

Medal table

Women
Debuted: 2000

Medal table

Mixed team
Debuted: 2020.

Medal table

Mixed team (bobsleigh and skeleton)
Debuted: 2007

Medal table

IBSF World Championships cumulative medal count
Updated after the IBSF World Championships 2023.

Bobsleigh

Skeleton

Mixed team (bobsleigh and skeleton)

Overall

Multiple medalists
Boldface denotes active athletes and highest medal count among all athletes (including these who not included in these tables) per type. "Position" denotes position of bobsledder in a crew (P – bobsledder won all own medals as a pilot; B – bobsledder won all own medals as a brakeman / brakewoman and / or as a pusher; B/P – bobsledder won own medals firstly as a brakeman / brakewoman and / or as a pusher and then as a pilot).

Men's bobsleigh

Women's bobsleigh

Men's skeleton

Women's skeleton

References
2-Man bobsleigh World Champions
2-Woman bobsleigh World Champions
4-Man bobsleigh World Champions
Men's skeleton World Champions
Mixed bobsleigh/skeleton World Champions
Women's skeleton World Champions

 
Recurring sporting events established in 1930
World Championships
World Championships
World championships in winter sports